Alexanderfeld (formerly Alexandru cel Bun and Cîmpeni) is a village in Cahul District, Moldova. It is a traditional ethnic and cultural center for Moldova's Bessarabian Germans.

Within the village are both a Pentecostal church and an Orthodox church (currently under construction). There is also a school, several small shops and a restaurant.

References

Villages of Cahul District